Vasile Iordache (born 9 October 1950) is a Romanian former football goalkeeper and current assistant coach at Steaua București, being responsible with goalkeepers' training.

Career
As a goalkeeper, Iordache played for FC Politehnica Iași (between 1969 and 1971), Steaua București (1972–1984) and FC Brașov (1984–1986) when he also was assistant coach. He won 23 caps for Romania between 1976 and 1984. After the game against England played on 29 April 1981, when he kept the goal safe for the whole 90 minutes of the game, he was named "The hero of the Wembley". He represented his country at the 1984 UEFA European Championship in France.

In 1986 joins again the squad of Steaua București as goalkeepers' coach, but leaves the club after four years when is named head coach of U Cluj, only to return to Steaua București as assistant coach one year later.

In 1994 leaves Romania and for eight years coaches various teams in The United Arab Emirates. Returns to Steaua București in 2002 and joins the technical team of the club's Under 21 side.

Since 2003 is part of Cosmin Olăroiu's technical team and coaches at FC Naţional Bucharest, FCU Politehnica Timişoara and again Steaua București, Al-Sadd Sports Club.

Honours

Player
Steaua București
Liga I (2): 1975–76, 1977–78
Cupa României (2): 1975–76, 1978–79

Notes

References

External links
 
 
 
 
 
 Profile at steauafc.com 

1950 births
Living people
Sportspeople from Iași
Romanian footballers
Olympic footballers of Romania
Romania international footballers
Liga I players
FC Steaua București players
FC Politehnica Iași (1945) players
FC Brașov (1936) players
Association football goalkeepers
UEFA Euro 1984 players
FC Universitatea Cluj managers
Al Sadd SC managers
Expatriate football managers in Qatar
Romanian football managers